Moon cactus or mooncactus may refer to:
 Gymnocalycium mihanovichii, often called chin cactus. Sold with colored mutants grafted to a green base.
 Epiphyllum anguliger, commonly known as the fishbone cactus
 Harrisia martinii, or Martin's apple-cactus, a night blooming cactus